Simo Ezra Mfayela (died 29 December 2020) was a South African politician from KwaZulu-Natal who served as a permanent delegate to the National Council of Provinces from May 2019 until his death. He was the sole permanent representative of the Inkatha Freedom Party and the deputy provincial chairperson of the party. Mfayela was the son of the former senator Senzo Mfayela.

Life and career
Mfayela's father, Senzo, was a senator and a senior member of the Inkatha Freedom Party. He is deceased. Mfayela was elected deputy provincial chairperson of the IFP in June 2019, deputising for Thamsanqa Ntuli.

Parliamentary career
Mfayela was sworn in as a permanent delegate to the National Council of Provinces on 23 May 2019, following the 2019 general election held on 8 May. He was a member of the KwaZulu-Natal delegation and the sole permanent IFP representative. Mfayela received his committee assignments on 24 June.

Committee memberships
Joint Committee on Ethics and Members Interests
Joint Standing Committee on Defence
Select Committee on Cooperative Governance and Traditional Affairs, Water and Sanitation and Human Settlements
Select Committee on Petitions and Executive Undertakings
Select Committee on Security and Justice

Death
Mfayela died on 29 December 2020.

References

External links

2020 deaths
Zulu people
Year of birth missing
Place of birth missing
Place of death missing
People from KwaZulu-Natal
Inkatha Freedom Party politicians
21st-century South African politicians
Members of the National Council of Provinces
Date of birth unknown
Deaths from the COVID-19 pandemic in South Africa